Lică Nunweiller (12 December 1938 – 8 November 2013) was a Romanian international football midfielder who played for clubs in Romania and Turkey.

Club career
Lică Nunweiller was born in Piatra Neamț on 13 November 1938, but his parents told the authorities that he was born on 12 November 1938, because they felt that the number 13 brings bad luck. He had an Austrian father named Johann Nunweiller, who settled in Piatra Neamț after World War II where he met his wife, Rozina, later they moved from Piatra Neamț to Bucharest. He had six brothers, the oldest one of them, Constantin was a water polo player and the other five: Dumitru, Ion, Victor, Radu and Eduard were footballers, each of them having at least one spell at Dinamo București, they are the reason why the club's nickname is "The Red Dogs". Lică made his Divizia A debut, playing for Dinamo București on 5 June 1960 in a 2–0 victory against Rapid București. Throughout his first period spent at Dinamo's senior team from 1960 until 1967, he won four consecutive Divizia A titles with the club from 1962 to 1965 and a Cupa României in 1964, also appearing in 11 matches without scoring in the European Cup. In 1967, he joined Dinamo Bacău for two seasons. Nunweiller next moved to Turkey to join Beşiktaş J.K. in 1969, making him one of the first Romanians to play professional football in Turkey. He made only one appearance in the Süper Lig during the 1969–70 season, before returning to Romania to end his career at Dinamo București in 1970.

International career
Lică Nunweiller played four friendly games at international level for Romania, making his debut on 8 October 1961 under coach Gheorghe Popescu I in a 4–0 victory against Turkey. His following games were a 3–2 victory against East Germany, a 0–0 against Turkey and a 1–1 against Austria.

Honours
Dinamo București
Divizia A: 1961–62, 1962–63, 1963–64, 1964–65
Cupa României: 1963–64

Notes

References

1938 births
2013 deaths
Sportspeople from Piatra Neamț
Romanian footballers
Romanian people of Austrian descent
Romanian expatriate footballers
Olympic footballers of Romania
Romania international footballers
Victoria București players
FC Dinamo București players
FCM Bacău players
Liga I players
Liga II players
Süper Lig players
Beşiktaş J.K. footballers
Expatriate footballers in Turkey
Association football midfielders